Stereo is the fourth solo album by Paul Westerberg. At this point in his career, the former Replacements leader was entering a new phase. He said goodbye to professional studios and big-name producers like Brendan O'Brien and Don Was, recording the album in his basement by himself. As detailed in the liner notes, Westerberg made no effort to fix imperfections like the tape running out in the middle of a song. Stereo was packaged with Mono, which he credited to his Grandpaboy alter ego. Vagrant Records also had a limited release of Mono as a separate album.

The hidden track that closes Stereo, "Postcards from Paradise", is a cover of a Flesh for Lulu song.

On November 29, 2019, Stereo/Mono was released as a double LP as part of Record Store Day's Black Friday.

Track listing
All songs written by Paul Westerberg, except where noted.

Disc 1: Grandpa Boy Mono
"High Time"
"I'll Do Anything"
"Let's Not Belong Together”
"Silent Film Star"
"Knock It Right Out"
"2 Days 'Til Tomorrow"
"Eyes Like Sparks"
"Footsteps"
"Kickin' the Stall"
"Between Love & Like"
"AAA"

Disc 2: Paul Westerberg Stereo
"Baby Learns to Crawl"
"Dirt to Mud"
"Only Lie Worth Telling"
"Got You Down"
"No Place for You"
"Boring Enormous"
"Nothing to No One"
"We May Be the Ones"
"Don't Want Never"
Untitled ("Strike Down the Band")
"Mr. Rabbit" (Traditional)
"Let the Bad Times Roll"
"Call That Gone?"
"Postcards from Paradise" (Hidden track) (Rocco Barker, Nick Marsh, Kevin Mills, James Mitchell)

Note: Track listing on Stereo is numbered differently as it omits "Strike Down the Band" and the hidden track, "Postcards from Paradise". It lists only 12 songs. "Postcards from Paradise" is located on the same track as "Call That Gone?", following a short period of silence.

Personnel
 Grandpaboy – guitar & vocals
 Elrod Puce – backing vocals, maracas, handclaps
 Zeke Pine – bass
 Henry Twiddle – drums
with:
 Luther Covington – superfluous lead guitar

References

2002 albums
Paul Westerberg albums
Vagrant Records albums
Albums produced by Paul Westerberg
Folk rock albums by American artists